La Chapelle-Saint-Géraud is a commune in the Corrèze department in central France.

Population

Geography
The Maronne river forms the commune's northeastern boundary.

See also
Communes of the Corrèze department

References

Communes of Corrèze